Otitoma fergusoni is a species of sea snail, a marine gastropod mollusk in the family Pseudomelatomidae.

Description
The length of the shell attains 5 mm.

Distribution
This marine species occurs in the Pacific Ocean off the Cook Islands.

References

 Wiedrick S.G. (2014). Review of the genera Otitoma Jousseaume, 1880 and Thelecytharella with the description of two new species Gastropoda: Conoidea: Pseudomelatomidae) from the southwest Pacific Ocean. The Festivus. 46(3): 40-53

External links
 Gastropods.com: Otitoma fergusoni

fergusoni
Gastropods described in 2014